The 1954–55 Bulgarian Hockey League season was the fourth season of the Bulgarian Hockey League, the top level of ice hockey in Bulgaria. Seven teams participated in the league, and Torpedo Sofia won the championship.

Standings

Bul
Bulgarian Hockey League seasons
Bulg